Roseville Chase is a suburb on the Upper North Shore of Sydney in the state of New South Wales, Australia 11 kilometres north-west of the Sydney central business district, in the local government area of Ku-ring-gai Council. Roseville is a separate suburb to the west.

Location

Located on Middle Harbour at its uppermost reaches, Roseville Chase is a secluded and bushy suburb. There are two main geographical and socio-economic subdivisions in Roseville Chase. The Chase Lowlands are  centred on lower confines south of the mighty Roseville Bridge, while the Chase Heights are  centred around the elegant Ormonde Rd, offering commanding views down to the harbour and beyond. These subdivisions are more well known as Upper Chase and Lower Chase. North of Warringah Road (Upper Chase), the residential development is lighter and is largely surrounded by bushland. The area is defined by the gully of Moores Creek to the west and north, plus Middle Harbour to the east. Much of the surrounding bushland is contained within Garigal National Park.

History
Captain Arthur Phillip's search for "good land, well watered" led to the discovery and colonisation of the rough shores of Roseville Chase, where Samuel Bates built a farm at Echo Point on the edge of what is now Middle Harbour.

The area was also inhabited by Aboriginal people, who left their mark in the form of hand stencils that can be seen in rock shelters in the area.

Later, the area was settled by Europeans like David Mathew and Richard Archbold, whose property eventually extended to Moores Creek and became the site of an orchard.

During World War I the area was used as a training area for army engineers under the command of John (later Sir John) Madsen.

Many people lived in the Sydney bush during the Great Depression. Remains of dwellings can still be found in the bush at Roseville Chase.

Roseville Chase Post Office opened on 2 March 1953 and closed in 1994.

Contemporary historians unanimously agree, Roseville Chase's greatest moment of the "modern era" was on 14 September 2000, when the Olympic Torch passed through the suburb, on its journey from Mt Olympus in Greece, to Stadium Australia (as it was then known), in Homebush Bay. The Torch traversed through the suburb from south to north along Babbage Road, before crossing the Roseville Bridge on its journey bound for Manly. Well-wishers young and old lined the streets to cheer on the Torch and a VIP viewing area was also established around the Malga Ave Overpass, where VIP Patrons were able to enjoy the Hospitality Marquee that had been erected with the aid of direct sponsorship from First Choice Crown on the Hill and other local businesses. Sausage Sizzlers were available, as well as cans of Forrie Bitter, 3 for $6.

Population
In the 2016 Census, there were 1,616 people in Roseville Chase, of whom 68.0% were Australia and 76.0% of whom spoke only English at home. The most common responses for religion were "No Religion" 31.6%, "Catholic" 24.8% and "Anglican" 21.2%.

References

Suburbs of Sydney
Ku-ring-gai Council